Eugene Cox may refer to:
 C. Eugene Cox, Bermudian politician
 Eugene Saint Julien Cox, American politician and lawyer. 
 Edward E. Cox, known as Eugene, US Representative from Georgia